Idol Poland (season 3) was the third season of Idol Poland. Monika Brodka won over Kuba Kęsy.

Finals

Finalists
(ages stated at time of contest)

Live Show Details

Heat 1 (9 October 2003)

Heat 2 (13 October 2003)

Heat 3 (16 October 2003)

Heat 4 (20 October 2003)

Heat 5 (23 October 2003)

Live Show 1 (2 November 2003)
Theme: Unforgettable

Live Show 2 (9 November 2003)
Theme: Rock

Live Show 3 (16 November 2003)
Theme: Millennium

Live Show 4 (23 November 2003)
Theme: Clubbing

Live Show 5 (30 November 2003)
Theme: Latino

Live Show 6 (7 December 2003)
Theme: Movies

Live Show 7 (14 December 2003)
Theme: Multilanguages

Live Show 8: Semi-final (21 December 2003)
Theme: Love Songs

Live final (4 January 2004)

External links
Official Website via Web Archive

3
2004 Polish television seasons